Michael J. Basrak (November 23, 1912 – December 18, 1973) was an All-American US collegiate football player in the mid-1930s. Basrak was Duquesne University's first All-American selection, and the Most Valuable Player of the 1937 Orange Bowl game in Miami, in which Duquesne defeated Mississippi State University, 13-12. Later in 1937 Basrak was the first-round draft pick (#5 pick overall) of the National Football League Pittsburgh Pirates, later called the Pittsburgh Steelers. However, Basrak only played two seasons in the NFL, retiring after the 1938 season.

Basrak was an officer in the United States Navy during the Second World War. In later life Basrak served as football coach at Niles East High School (1954–62) and then Niles West High School (1963–73), both in Skokie, Illinois, a suburb north of Chicago.

Basrak died at home in Skokie on December 18, 1973, aged 61. After his death, the Niles West football field was named Mike Basrak Field in his honor.

References

1912 births
1973 deaths
All-American college football players
American football centers
Pittsburgh Pirates (football) players
Duquesne Dukes football players
Duquesne University alumni
People from Bellaire, Ohio
American people of Serbian descent
Players of American football from Ohio
United States Navy personnel of World War II
United States Navy officers